Matamec Ecological Reserve is an ecological reserve in Sept-Îles, in Sept-Rivières Regional County Municipality, in Quebec, Canada. It was established in 1995 and is located within the new boundaries of the recently amalgamated city of Sept-Îles.

References

External links
 Official website from Government of Québec

Nature reserves in Quebec
Protected areas established in 1995
Sept-Îles, Quebec
Protected areas of Côte-Nord
1995 establishments in Quebec